Green Magnet School was an experimental rock band formed in Massachusetts in 1987.  The founding members included Tim Shea on guitar and vocals, Rob Hamilton on drums, Can Keskin on guitar and bass, Steve Rzucidlo on bass, and Chris Pearson on guitar and vocals.  Later the line-up would change to feature Jeff Iwanicki on bass and Greg Gilmartin on drums.

Overview and biography
The band defied easy categorization, but the three-guitar cacophony of its music was often referred to in the subgenres of noise rock, post punk, no wave, and even industrial music.  After releasing a string of indie singles, the band briefly signed with Sub Pop records in 1992 and released their debut CD Blood Music, named after a science fiction novel of the same title by author Greg Bear.  The album was critically acclaimed, and the bleak, dystopian nature of both the lyrics and music were compared by UK music journalists to such groups as Killing Joke, Live Skull, Gang of Four, and early Sonic Youth.

After playing and touring extensively with both Boston-based and national acts such as The Lemonheads, Come, Galaxie 500, Dinosaur Jr., The Afghan Whigs, The Flaming Lips and The Jesus Lizard, as well as playing the second stage at Lollapalooza in 1992, the group released a CD EP titled Revisionist in 1993, and what would be their final CD, Illuminatus, in 1995.  After several line-up changes, GMS finally disbanded in 1997.  Now regarded as a highly underrated, influential band ahead of its time, Green Magnet School is considered one of the seminal indie rock groups that sprouted from the fertile, post-grunge Boston music community of the late 1980s to early 1990s.

The band reunited for one night on October 7, 2004 to play a sold-out benefit/memorial show at The Middle East nightclub in Cambridge, Massachusetts.

Post-breakup activity
Several former members of the band remain currently active in ongoing musical projects including Black Helicopter, Ekranoplan, Low-Country Messiahs and Teleffonic (see External Links below.)

Notable live shows
 1993 or (Friday, February 11, 1994?) at Brownies (NYC)
 CMJ New Music Marathon (with Babe the Blue Ox and Godplow)

Discography

Singles
 "CO" split with God's Acre (Toxic Shock Records) 1990
 "White People" (Sonic Bubblegum Records) 1991
 "White People" split with Six Finger Satellite (Hippy Knight Records, Australia) 1991
 "Singed" (Sub Pop Records Single-of-the-Month Club, Dec. 1991)
 "Blind in My Mouth" (Hippy Knight Records, Australia) 1992
 "Declaration of Techno-Colonial Independence" 2×7 with Six Finger Satellite (Sub Pop Records) 1993

Albums
 "Blood Music" (Sub Pop/Genius Records) 1992
 "Revisionist" (Sonic Bubblegum Records) 1993
 "Illuminatus" (Sonic Bubblegum Records) 1995

Miscellaneous
 "Windshield" on "Where's Stanton Park?"-LP (Stanton Park Records) 1989
 "Blood Music"-LP (Sub Pop/Glitterhouse Records Germany) 1992
 "Throb" on "Revolution Come and Gone"-CD (Sub Pop Europe) 1993
 "Blind in My Mouth" on "Self Mutilation"-CD (Hippy Knight Records, Australia) 1994
 "Slipper" on "Pipeline!"-CD (Kimchee Records) 1996

External links
 official Green Magnet School Bandcamp page
 Sub Pop band page for Green Magnet School

American experimental musical groups
American noise rock music groups
Indie rock musical groups from Massachusetts
Musical groups disestablished in 1997
Musical groups established in 1987
1987 establishments in Massachusetts
1997 disestablishments in Massachusetts
Sub Pop artists